Adhur Gushnasp (also spelled Arderveshnasp) was the  ("margrave") of the Sasanian province of Armenia from 465 to 482. He was killed during the Armenian rebellion of 482–484, and replaced by Sahak II Bagratuni.

Biography

The country was at the time dissatisfied with Zoroastrian Sasanian rule. The policies of the previous shahanshah Yazdegerd II of integrating the Christian nobility into the bureaucracy by forcing them to convert to Zoroastrianism had resulted in a large-scale rebellion in 451, led by the Armenian military leader Vardan Mamikonian. Although the Sasanians defeated the rebels at the Battle of Avarayr, the impact of the rebellion was still felt, and tensions continued to grow. In 482, a secret meeting took place between a group of Christian Armenians, who prepared to rebel under the leadership of Vahan Mamikonian, a nephew of Vardan. 

Varaz-Shapur Amatuni, who was present in the meeting, informed Adhur Gushnasp of the impending uprising, which made him abandon the Armenian capital of Dvin and leave for the fortress of Ani, where he briefly stayed for a day, and then fled to the city of Artaxata whilst being chased by the rebels. They soon besieged the city, but Adhur Gushnasp managed to escape by night and reached the neighbouring province of Adurbadagan. At the same time, discord was occurring amongst the rebels, with a certain Varaz-Narseh, prince of Urts, pillaging the city of Brhnavezh. The rebels installed the aspet Sahak II Bagratuni as the new  of Armenia. Raising a force of 7,000 troops from Adurbadagan and its surroundings, Adhur Gushnasp returned to Armenia. He soon clashed with a force of 400 men led by Vasak Mamikonian and Babgen Siwni near Akori, but was defeated and killed.

Notes

References

Sources
 
 
 
 
 
 
  

 

5th-century Iranian people
Sasanian governors of Armenia
Year of birth unknown
482 deaths
Generals of Peroz I
Iranian military personnel killed in action